Arnetta atkinsoni is a species of skipper butterfly found in South Asia (Sikkim to Assam, Burma, Thailand, Laos, Vietnam, Yunnan).

Description

It is found in Darjeeling, India.

Gallery

References

Arnetta
Butterflies of Asia
Butterflies described in 1878
Taxa named by Frederic Moore